This is a timeline of subatomic particle discoveries, including all particles thus far discovered which appear to be elementary (that is, indivisible) given the best available evidence.  It also includes the discovery of composite particles and antiparticles that were of particular historical importance.

More specifically, the inclusion criteria are:
 Elementary particles from the Standard Model of particle physics that have so far been observed.  The Standard Model is the most comprehensive existing model of particle behavior.  All Standard Model particles including the Higgs boson have been verified, and all other observed particles are combinations of two or more Standard Model particles.
 Antiparticles which were historically important to the development of particle physics, specifically the positron and antiproton.  The discovery of these particles required very different experimental methods from that of their ordinary matter counterparts, and provided evidence that all particles had antiparticles—an idea that is fundamental to quantum field theory, the modern mathematical framework for particle physics.  In the case of most subsequent particle discoveries, the particle and its anti-particle were discovered essentially simultaneously.
 Composite particles which were the first particle discovered containing a particular elementary constituent, or whose discovery was critical to the understanding of particle physics.

See also

 List of baryons
 List of mesons 
 List of particles

References

Particle discoveries
Particle physics